Melissa Ben-Ishay (born Melissa Bushell) is the founder of Baked by Melissa, a cupcake company headquartered in New York City, which specializes in small cupcakes.

Early life and education 
Melissa Bushell was born in Hillsdale, New Jersey. After graduating from high school, she attended Syracuse University, in Syracuse, New York from 2002 to 2006, receiving a Bachelor's of Science degree in Child and Family Studies.

Career 

After graduating university in 2006, Ben-Ishay worked at an advertising agency. In 2008, she was fired from her job as a media planner, and was encouraged by her brother, Brian Bushell, to try a career in baking cupcakes.

In 2009, she opened a bakery called Baked by Melissa in the SoHo neighborhood on Manhattan. Bushell was the CEO of Baked by Melissa for 8 years. The company logo is a tie-dye cupcake.

The company has 14 locations and ships cupcakes across the United States.

In 2017, Ben-Ishay released a cookbook titled Cakes by Melissa: Life Is What You Bake It., published by William Morrow Cookbooks.

Personal life 
Melissa Ben-Ishay is married to Adi Ben-Ishay, who also works for Baked by Melissa.

References 

Living people
American chief executives of food industry companies
American cookbook writers
American bakers
Women cookbook writers
American women chief executives
Syracuse University College of Arts and Sciences alumni
Year of birth missing (living people)